Lumbaca-Unayan, officially the Municipality of Lumbaca-Unayan (Maranao: Inged a Lumbaca-Unayan), is a  municipality in the province of Lanao del Sur, Philippines. According to the 2020 census, it has a population of 8,131 people.

Through the Muslim Mindanao Autonomy Act No. 106, signed by Nur Misuari on November 22, 2000, the new municipality was created from Lumbatan. A positive affirmation was given in a plebiscite on November 27, 2004.

Geography

Barangays
Lumbaca-Unayan is politically subdivided into 9 barangays.
 Bangon
 Proper Beta
 Calalon (formerly Ka-alawan)
 Calipapa
 Dagudob (not included)
 Dapolac (not included)
 Dilausan
 Dimapaok
 Lumbaca-Dilausan
 Pualas (not included)
 Oriental Beta
 Tringun

Climate

History
In 2004, nine barangays of Pat ka Apo sa Macadar in Lumbatan were made into Lumbaca-Unayan, a separate municipality among nine Princess of Unayan (e.g.in Meranau terms: 1. Andong sa Macadar 2. Ungklan sa Bita,3. Sana Lumbayanague, 4. Uyoda sa Madamba, 5. Inoda sa Ganassi, 6. Ayor sa Linindingan, 7. inkini sa Tubaran, 8.Togon sa Kadinguilan, 9. Dadauba sa Biabi 10. Borowa Pagayawan).

Demographics

Economy

References

External links
Lumbaca-Unayan Profile at the DTI Cities and Municipalities Competitive Index
[ Philippine Standard Geographic Code]
Philippine Census Information
Local Governance Performance Management System

Municipalities of Lanao del Sur